Bobby Frank Collier (December 11, 1929 – November 15, 2000) was an American football offensive tackle who played one season with the Los Angeles Rams of the National Football League (NFL). He was drafted by the Rams in the 18th round of the 1950 NFL Draft. He played college football at Southern Methodist University and attended Longview High School in Longview, Texas.

References

External links
Just Sports Stats

1929 births
2000 deaths
Players of American football from Arkansas
American football offensive tackles
SMU Mustangs football players
Los Angeles Rams players
People from Stephens, Arkansas